Veltheim is a municipality in Germany. Veltheim may also refer to
Veltheim (surname)
Veltheim, Aargau, a municipality in Switzerland
Veltheim (Winterthur), a district in Winterthur, Switzerland